Tha Smokin' Nephew is the first major label studio album by the rapper Baby Bash and his third album overall. Released on September 23, 2003 by Universal Records, it entered the Billboard 200 at number 48. Five months after its release, the album was certified Gold by the RIAA. By March 2005, the album had sold 531,000 copies in the United States.

Singles 
Suga Suga is a song by American rapper Baby Bash featuring Frankie J. The song was written by both singers and was released on July 21, 2003, as the second and final single from Baby Bash's third studio album, Tha Smokin' Nephew (2003). It is Baby Bash's highest-charting song on the US Billboard Hot 100, reaching number seven, and it appeared on several international rankings, including the New Zealand Singles Chart, where it peaked at number one. It has received sales certifications in Australia, Germany, New Zealand, and the United States.

A second single named Shorty Doowop featuring Tiffany Villarreal et Russell Lee was released in 2004.

Critical reception

Steve 'Flash' Juon of RapReviews gave the album high praise for Happy Perez's Hispanic-influenced production and Bash's smooth, laid-back delivery, concluding that "Bash may be a long-time veteran of hip-hop and latin rap, but he represents the newest trends and emerging dopeness of regionally recognized hispanic hip-hop to the best and fullest. Easily one of 2003's "must cop" albums, Tha Smokin' Nephew will open many eyes and please just as many ears." AllMusic's David Jeffries also praised Perez's production for being energetic and cohesive, and Bash's lyrical content for containing different topics, concluding that "At 17 tracks it runs a little long, but there are only a few seeds and sticks to pick out of Baby Bash's fat bag." Jonah Weiner of Blender panned the album for its lady-focused lyrical content being mediocrely delivered over subpar production. He added that the single "Suga Suga" was the only noteworthy track on the album.

Track listing

Samples
"Suga Suga" contains a sample of "I'm Gonna Love You Just a Little More Baby" by Barry White

Charts

Certifications

References

External links
 ''Tha Smokin' Nephew at Discogs
 ''Tha Smokin' Nephew at MusicBrainz
 Tha Smokin' Nephew at Tower Records

2003 albums
Baby Bash albums
Universal Records albums
West Coast hip hop albums
Albums produced by Happy Perez